State Route 157 (SR 157) is a short secondary highway in northern Obion County, Tennessee.

Route description
SR 157 begins at its junction with SR 22 northeast of Samburg and continues in a northerly direction toward the Kentucky/Tennessee state line as it passes through or nearby the unincorporated communities Walnut Log and Fishgap Hill.  At the state line, the route changes to Kentucky Route 311 and continues on to Hickman, Kentucky.  This highway carries a  speed limit and is designated as a secondary highway throughout its entire length in the State of Tennessee. It also passes through the Reelfoot National Wildlife Refuge.

Points of Interest (South to North)
 Reelfoot National Wildlife Refuge/Lake Isom National Wildlife Refuge Headquarters and Visitor's Center
 Reelfoot National Wildlife Refuge -- Grassy Island Unit -- Auto Tour, Hiking Trails, and Boat it Ramp off Walnut Log Road
 Reelfoot National Wildlife Refuge -- Long Point Unit -- Access via Kentucky Route 311 and Kentucky Route 1282

Major intersections

References

Tennessee Department of Transportation
Obion County Highway Map
Reelfoot National Wildlife Refuge Home Page
Lake Isom National Wildlife Refuge Home Page

157
Transportation in Obion County, Tennessee